The Akaflieg München Mü11 Papagei is a primary glider that was designed and built in Germany in 1935.

Development 
The Mü11 Papagei, (Parrot), was a Primary style training glider similar to the SG-38 but with a Mü Scheibe aerofoil section. Flight trials were carried out but there is very little information available. Only one photograph and a contemporary model survive. The photograph shows the pilots seat surrounded by a plywood nacelle.

References

1930s German sailplanes
Mu11
Aircraft first flown in 1935